Puntchesakut Lake Provincial Park is a provincial park in British Columbia, Canada. It is approximately 16.7m deep and has trout as the main fish source.

References

Geography of the Cariboo
Provincial parks of British Columbia
1980 establishments in British Columbia
Protected areas established in 1980